Memorial Park is an urban park in upper Downtown, Port of Spain, Trinidad and Tobago. Memorial Park is a public city park in commemoration of the Trinidadian veterans that served in World War I and World War II. It is one of the most visited urban parks in the city.

Location 
Memorial Park is located south of the Queens Park Savannah, west of Charlotte Street, north of Keate Street, and adjacent to the National Academy for the Performing Arts and the National Museum and Art Gallery.

Geography of Port of Spain
Parks in Trinidad and Tobago
1945 establishments in Trinidad and Tobago
World War II memorials
Tourist attractions in Port of Spain